Papatoetoe railway station is on the Southern Line and Eastern Line of the Auckland railway network in New Zealand. It is between Station Road and Shirley Road, across the street from Papatoetoe West School, and has an island platform layout.

History
Papatoetoe was originally called Papatoitoi, a corruption of its true name. The name was corrected in 1907, by the New Zealand Railways Department, because of the obvious discrepancy with the town it served, which has always been spelt as "Papatoetoe".

Old station building
The old station building, restored by the Papatoetoe Railway Station Preservation Trust, has been moved to the corner of Station Road, Shirley Road, Tavern Lane & St George Street and repurposed into a café. Parts of this building dated back to 1875. A new station was constructed on the present site.

The old station is an integral part of the area's history, with Old Papatoetoe developing as a commercial centre.

Timeline

Services
Auckland One Rail, on behalf of Auckland Transport, operates suburban services to Britomart, Manukau, Papakura and Pukekohe via Papatoetoe. The typical weekday off-peak timetable is:
6 tph to Britomart, consisting of:
3 tph via Glen Innes (Eastern Line)
3 tph via Penrose and Newmarket (Southern Line)
3 tph to Manukau
3 tph to Papakura

Bus routes 31, 36 and 313 serve Papatoetoe station.

See also 
 List of Auckland railway stations
 Public transport in Auckland

References

 Brochure from the Papatoetoe Railway Station Preservation Trust

External links
 Stations on the Move – includes Papatoetoe Station

Buildings and structures in Auckland
Rail transport in Auckland
Railway stations in New Zealand
Railway stations opened in 1875
Ōtara-Papatoetoe Local Board Area